Les Francofolies de Spa is an annual music festival in Spa, Belgium.

It is usually held in the month of July of every year and aims at promoting francophone music. Those attending the festival in 2008 exceeded 200,000.

Best young artists 
 2007 : Suarez
 2008 : Thierry Dell 
 2009 : Coco Royal
 2010 : MatheO
 2011 : Joey Acta

See also
Les Francofolies de La Rochelle
Les FrancoFolies de Montréal

References

External links

Organisation internationale de la Francophonie
Spa, Belgium